The Aragon Ballroom on Lick Pier in the Ocean Park district of Santa Monica, California, was a social-dance venue opened under the Aragon name in March 1942 by dance promoter Harry Schooler (born Harrison Augustus Schooler; 1918–2008).

History
The ballroom and the pier, named Lick Pier, was erected in 1922.  The pier was situated at the foot of Navy Street adjoining the south side of the Pickering Pier.  Lick Pier was, in 1922, almost entirely in Venice. It was 800 feet long and 225 feet wide.  At the opening of Lick Pier and the Bon Ton Ballroom on Easter weekend 1922, the ballroom was 22,000 square feet, and the pier featured a Zip roller coaster, a Dodge'em, Caterpillar rides, and Captive Aeroplane rides.  Development, costing $250,000, commenced in 1921 and was financed by Charles Jacob Lick (1882–1971), Austin Aloysius McFadden (1875–1960), and George William Leihy (1865–1940).

Schooler renamed it the Aragon, then spent some $50,000 to refurbish it.

By August 1943, the 25-year-old Schooler was earning $55 a week as a toolmaker at Douglas Aircraft Co. in Santa Monica during the graveyard shift, a job which he later claimed he retained to protect himself from the wartime draft. But the balance of his reported $250,000-a-year gross income came from his several roles as dance hall impresario, bandleader and promoter, which by August 1943 included seven nights a week at the Aragon Ballroom, Friday and Saturday nights with the Swing Shift Dances (12:30 a.m. to 5 a.m.) at the nearby Casino Gardens, monthly dances for African-Americans at the Shrine Auditorium in Los Angeles and barn dancing in the Plantation Ballroom in Culver City.

Billboard magazine reported in July 1944 that "cowboy outfits" such as Spade Cooley and Bob Wills had been, and would continue to be, booked to play at the ballroom.

The Aragon was later known as the hall where Lawrence Welk and his big band, the "Champagne Music Makers," parlayed a scheduled four-week engagement in spring 1951 into a ten-year stint and a noted television show. Welk's orchestra played to crowds numbering as high as 7,000. Klaus Landsberg, the manager of Los Angeles television station KTLA, offered Welk the opportunity to appear on television, and on May 11, 1951, the station began broadcasting a weekly show live from the Aragon featuring Welk's band. The show evolved into The Lawrence Welk Show, broadcast each Saturday night on ABC.

Welk’s stint at the Aragon ended in 1955, when he moved The Lawrence Welk Show to a television studio in Hollywood. The Aragon soon went into decline. In 1963 it was opened briefly for dancing by Ralph Morris, the promoter from The Rendezvous Ballroom in Balboa. "The Beach Boys" opened, and "The Challengers" were the dance band. But "Surf music" did not produce the crowds it had in Balboa, and the Aragon was soon closed again.  During 1965-66 it became  a roller skating rink. A famous Roller Derby skater, Charlie "Specs" Saunders was the owner. Around 1967 it became the Cheetah Club where bands including The Doors and Pink Floyd played as well as The Nazz (an outfit that evolved into Alice Cooper not the band featuring Todd Rundgren). It was destroyed by fire on May 26, 1970.

A major sequence in the 1950 Warner Bros. film Young Man with a Horn featuring Kirk Douglas, Doris Day and Hoagy Carmichael was set and filmed at the Aragon and remains the best filmic evidence of what the ballroom looked like in its heyday.

Notable performers 
The Bon Ton Ballroom: 1922–1942
 1922–1924: Harry Baisden and His Bon Ton Orchestra
 1924–1925: Ben Pollack and His Bon Ton Orchestra

The Aragon Ballroom: 1942–1967
 1944: Spade Cooley
 1944: Bob Wills
 1951–1955: Lawrence Welk

Cheetah Club: 1967–1970
 1969: Black Pearl
 Charles Wright & the Watts 103rd Street Rhythm Band
 The Grateful Dead
 The Standells
 The Doors
 The Leaves
 Iron Butterfly
 Pink Floyd
 Alice Cooper

References

External links
Lawrence Welk visiting the charred remains of the Aragon Ballroom, May 28, 1970 (photo).

Buildings and structures in Santa Monica, California
Music venues in Los Angeles
Ballrooms in the United States
Defunct nightclubs in California
Dance venues in the United States
Former music venues in California
Burned buildings and structures in the United States
Demolished buildings and structures in Los Angeles
Demolished buildings and structures in California
Buildings and structures completed in 1922
Buildings and structures demolished in 1970
1922 establishments in California
1970 disestablishments in California